Jake David Mulraney (born 5 April 1996) is an Irish professional footballer who plays as a midfielder for League of Ireland Premier Division club St Patrick's Athletic.

Born in Dublin, Mulraney has previously played for Ilkeston, Queens Park Rangers, Inverness Caledonian Thistle, Heart of Midlothian, Atlanta United and Orlando City, with loan spells at Dagenham & Redbridge and Stevenage.

Club career

Queens Park Rangers
On 10 December 2014 Mulraney, who had been playing for Ilkeston following his release by Nottingham Forest, signed an 18-month professional contract with Premier League side Queens Park Rangers.

Dagenham & Redbridge (loan)
On 7 October 2015, Mulraney joined Dagenham & Redbridge on a one-month loan deal. He made his debut the same day in a 2–1 victory away to Stevenage in the Football League Trophy coming on as a substitute in the 54th minute.

Inverness Caledonian Thistle
On 17 June 2016, Mulraney joined Inverness Caledonian Thistle on a two-year deal.

Heart of Midlothian
On 15 May 2018, Mulraney joined Heart of Midlothian in a swap deal for Angus Beith. Mulraney scored two goals in 52 appearances for Hearts.

Atlanta United
On 28 January 2020, Mulraney joined Major League Soccer club Atlanta United. He made his debut for the club on 25 February 2020 in the CONCACAF Champions League against Motagua, starting in the 3–0 victory. Mulraney scored his first goal for Atlanta United on 14 October 2020 against Inter Miami, his 83rd minute goal being the equalizer in the 1–1 draw.

Orlando City
On 5 May 2022, Atlanta United transferred Mulraney to Orlando City in exchange for $200,000 in General Allocation Money with a potential further $75,000 in GAM pending performance-based conditions. The deal included a percentage of the fee from any future sale.

St Patrick's Athletic
Oh 18 January 2023, it was announced that Mulraney had returned to Ireland, signing for his local League of Ireland Premier Division club St Patrick's Athletic on a multi year contract, with the terms of the transfer undisclosed.

Career statistics

Honours
Inverness Caledonian Thistle
Scottish Challenge Cup: 2017–18

Heart of Midlothian
Scottish Cup Runner Up: 2018–19

References

Living people
1996 births
Association footballers from Dublin (city)
Republic of Ireland association footballers
Association football midfielders
Nottingham Forest F.C. players
Ilkeston F.C. players
Queens Park Rangers F.C. players
Dagenham & Redbridge F.C. players
Stevenage F.C. players
Crumlin United F.C. players
Inverness Caledonian Thistle F.C. players
Heart of Midlothian F.C. players
Atlanta United FC players
Orlando City SC players
Orlando City B players
St Patrick's Athletic F.C. players
English Football League players
Major League Soccer players
MLS Next Pro players
League of Ireland players
Irish expatriate sportspeople in the United States
Republic of Ireland expatriate association footballers
Expatriate soccer players in the United States
Scottish Professional Football League players
Republic of Ireland youth international footballers
Republic of Ireland under-21 international footballers